Edgar Jacob Herschler (October 27, 1918 – February 5, 1990) was an American politician and attorney who served as the 28th Governor of Wyoming from 1975 to 1987. A member of the Democratic Party, he is the longest-serving Governor of Wyoming with three full terms; since a two-term limit for governors was approved by a ballot initiative in 1992, he has remained as such.

Early life

Edgar Jacob Herschler was born in Kemmerer, Wyoming on October 27, 1918, to Edgar Fuller Herschler and Charlotte Jenkins. During his childhood, he was initially taught at his family's ranch before later attended high school in Kemmerer. In 1941, he graduated from the University of Colorado with a Bachelor of Arts in Pre-Law. In 1949, he earned his LL.B from the University of Wyoming. Herschler served in the Pacific Theater during World War II.

He served as Kemmerer's city attorney and then as Lincoln County attorney from 1951 to 1958 and from 1961 to 1963.

Career

Legislature
On June 15, 1960, he filed to run for the Democratic nomination for one of Lincoln County's three seats in the Wyoming House of Representatives and won in the general election. Upon taking office he introduced a bill that would repeal Wyoming's inheritance tax. However, after the initial forty day session of the house he resigned on March 10, 1961, to become Lincoln County's attorney again, but filed to run for the house again in 1962 and won a seat in the general election placing second. In the 1964 elections the Democrats took control of the state house and in the 1965 legislative session Herschler was selected as House Majority Whip and made chairman of the House Judiciary Committee. In 1967 he cosponsored the first air pollution control bill in Wyoming and on September 13, 1968, he was elected as president of the Wyoming State Bar Association.

He was considered a possible candidate for governor in the 1970 election, but stated on December 10, 1969, that he was not interested in running for governor. On April 27, 1970, he announced that he would run for the Democratic nomination for Wyoming's at-large congressional district, but was defeated by former Representative Teno Roncalio who went on to win in the general election. On October 27 he endorsed Roncalio following his defeat in the August primary. In 1971 he stated that he was contacted by Governor Stanley K. Hathaway as being a possible appointment to the Wyoming Supreme Court, but was not selected.

Governor

On May 23, 1974, he announced that he would seek the Democratic nomination for governor and defeated former state senator Dick Jones in the general election. He was critical of President Jimmy Carter for his agricultural stances and water projects and when Carter visited Grand Teton National Park from August 24 to September 1, 1978, he had Herschler notified that he was not invited.

In 1978 he narrowly won reelection by 2,377 votes, but easily won reelection to a third term in 1982 becoming Wyoming's only governor to serve more than two terms. In 1986 he announced that he would not seek reelection to a fourth term.

In September 1981 Cody, Wyoming hosted the Western Governors Association's annual conference of that year and Herschler was selected as president of the Western Conference to serve a one-year term from 1981 to 1982.

In 1985, he commuted the sentences and ordered the releases of Deborah and Richard Janhke Jr., who were both convicted in 1983 of manslaughter in the 1982 death of their abusive father, Richard Jahnke Sr., in Cheyenne and who were the subjects of the television film Right to Kill? In September 1985 he had to file for bankruptcy due to the failure of his 18,500 acre Yellowstone Ranch with almost $6 million in debt.

During his tenure he vetoed more bills than any other governor in Wyoming's history, but none of his vetoes were ever overridden despite the Republicans holding supermajorities in both chambers during most of his tenure. Some of his vetoes were unpopular such as when in 1984 he vetoed a homeowners tax credit program stating that it would subsidize homeowners who did not need it which resulted in the Democrats losing seven seats in the House of Representatives.

Later life

After leaving office he returned to practicing law in Cheyenne and in 1988, multiple people attempted to convince him to run in the Senate election against Malcolm Wallop, but he chose not to. In February 1988, he endorsed and campaigned for Senator Al Gore for the Democratic presidential nomination and on March 5 Wyoming became the first of seven contests that Gore won in the presidential primaries. His successor as governor, Mike Sullivan, supported cigarette tax hikes and smoking bans and was added to Phillip Morris' list of smokers' enemies and in May 1988 Herschler criticized him for it and suggested that municipalities that ban smoking should not be given money from cigarette tax revenues.

In early December 1989, he was hospitalized for cancer treatment and released on December 15, but was re-hospitalized in January 1990. On February 5, 1990, he died in Cheyenne after suffering from cancer at age 71.

Electoral history

References

External links
National Governors Association info page for Edward Herschler.
Sobel, Robert, and John Raimo, eds. Biographical Directory of the Governors of the United States, 1789–1978, Vol. 4. Westport, Connecticut: Meckler Books, 1978, 4 vols.
The Council of State Governments: The Governors of the American States, Commonwealths, and Territories 1900–1980 (1980)

1918 births
1990 deaths
Democratic Party governors of Wyoming
Democratic Party members of the Wyoming House of Representatives
Wyoming lawyers
United States Marines
United States Marine Corps personnel of World War II
University of Wyoming alumni
Politicians from Cheyenne, Wyoming
People from Kemmerer, Wyoming
Military personnel from Wyoming
20th-century American lawyers
20th-century American politicians
Deaths from cancer in Wyoming
20th-century American Episcopalians
Recipients of the Silver Star